Andreas Wessels (born July 6, 1964) is a retired German football goalkeeper.

References

External links
 

1964 births
Living people
German footballers
VfL Bochum players
SC Fortuna Köln players
Bundesliga players

Association football goalkeepers